Peter Birmann (Basel, 14 December 1758 - Basel, 18 July 1844) was a Swiss painter.

The painter Samuel Birmann (1793-1847) was his son.

References

External links

 Pictures and texts of Voyage pittoresque de Basle à Bienne par les vallons de Mottiers-Grandval by Peter Birmann can be found in the database VIATIMAGES.

18th-century Swiss painters
18th-century Swiss male artists
Swiss male painters
19th-century Swiss painters
1758 births
1844 deaths
19th-century Swiss male artists